The Kertha Gosa Pavilion is an example of Balinese architecture located on the island of Bali, in city Klungkung, Indonesia. The Kertha Gosa Pavilion at Klungkung Palace was built in the early 18th century by Dewa Agung Gusti Sideman. Kertha Gosa means - "the place where the king meets with his ministries to discuss questions of justice".

The first function of the pavilion was for the court of law in 1945. Kertha Gosa was repainted in the 1920s and again in the 1960s. The Pavilion has a section of the Hindu epic Mahabharata, called Bhima Swarga, depicted around the ceiling.

Paintings

Use of iconography
The ceiling of Kertha Gosa is painted in a traditional Balinese style that resembles wayang (puppet theatre). Paintings in the wayang style are related closely to shadow theatre art, and have been faithfully preserved to reflect Bali's Hindu-Javanese heritage in its traditional iconography and content. Iconography was to represent living things through pictures and shadows because it was prohibited to represent any living entity.

Types of characters
All of the characters in the story of Bhima Swarga have a symbolic meaning relating to color and whether the characters are kasar or halus. Kasar characters, like the demons, are rough and coarse. They have big eyes, noses, and mouths. The hand positioning of the kasar characters is upward. 

Halus characters, in contrast, are refined and flowing, recognized by delicate hands and fingers. They have small eyes, noses, mouths with thin lips and uniform teeth, and almost no facial hair. Their heads and faces are pointed downward. Bhima, his siblings, and Kunti are all halus characters. One of Bhima's most important features, assigned only to him, is his right thumb which ends in a long curved nail as his weapon; this is a magical implication.

The angle of the head and body attitude of the characters are also important. For example, human heads and bodies are always in a straight-on position, but kasal characters are represented with eyes and nose at an angle.

Social hierarchy
In the paintings, social standing is portrayed by the hierarchical position of the characters, the size of their body, the side on which they are placed (left or right of the scene). Siwa, Heaven's most prominent god, is shown as larger and more intimidating than any other god. Similarly, Bhima dominates the other humans in the story. Bhima's servants Twalen and Mredah usually appear side by side, with Mredah, Twalen's son, placed a little below his father.

Age and social class also play a role in the placement of the five Pandawa brothers. Bhima's power is strictly physical, so his body must be unhindered and ready for battle. Bhima wears a black-and-white-checked sarong that, in Bali, is believed to have magic protective qualities. In Heaven, battle scenes are not bloody, and Bhima is usually in the center of the war panels. His body is much smaller than in hell, showing his diminished importance in comparison to the gods.

The Bhima Swarga painting is a moral epic, depicting wisdom and perseverance, and the ultimate victory virtue over vice. It is said, “He who with fervid devotion listens to a recitation of the Mahabharata attains to high success in consequence of the merit that becomes his through understanding even a very small portion thereof. All the sins of that man who recites or listens to this history with devotion are washed off.”

Construction works
Dewa Agung Gusti Sideman, patron of the arts, supervised the design and construction of his palace in Klungkung - an example of Hindu-Balinese architecture. Kertha Gosa is in the shape of a mandala, a Buddhist-influenced dome-shaped mountain. Kertha Gosa's first major function was as a court of law and justice. The pavilion was the meeting place for the raja (Hindu prince) and Brahman judges (Kerthas) to discuss issues of law and human affairs. It is not known whether the Bhima Swarga was painted at the time Kertha Gosa was built. The earliest, and only, record of paintings at Kertha Gosa dates from 1842 and is written in a lontar book (a book that holds prayers, history of Bali, and epics). Also it is not known whether the paintings were a permanent feature of the pavilion or if they were a temporary decoration for a celebration.

Dewa Agung Gusta Sideman ruled until 1775. He was succeeded by his son, then by his grandson, and his line of descendants continued to reign until the beginning of the 20th century. In 1908, the Dutch attacked Klungkung; it was the last Balinese kingdom to fall. In 1909, Kertha Gosa became the official court of Justice for the region of Klungkung.

Restoration works
In 1960 the entire ceiling at Kertha Gosa was replaced and new paintings were made, still depicting the story of Bhima Swarga but adding greater detail. In 1982 eight panels were replaced.

References
 Pucci, Idanna. Bhima Swarga: The Balinese Journey of the Soul. 1st pbk. ed. Boston: Little, Brown, 1992.

Houses in Indonesia
Buildings and structures in Bali